Rodgers and Hart were an American songwriting partnership between composer Richard Rodgers (1902–1979) and the lyricist Lorenz Hart (1895–1943). They worked together on 28 stage musicals and more than 500 songs from 1919 until Hart's death in 1943.

History
Richard Rodgers and Lorenz Hart were introduced in 1919; Rodgers was still in high school while Hart had already graduated from  Columbia University. Their first collaboration together was at Columbia, and resulted in the 1920 Varsity Show, Fly With Me, which incidentally also involved Oscar Hammerstein II. After writing together for several years, they produced their first successful Broadway musical, The Garrick Gaieties, in 1925, which introduced their hit song, "Manhattan" and led to a series of successful musicals and films.  They quickly became among the most popular songwriters in America, and from 1925 to 1931 had fifteen scores featured on Broadway. In the early 1930s they moved to Hollywood, where they created several popular songs for film, such as "Isn't It Romantic?" and "Lover", before returning to Broadway in 1935 with Billy Rose's Jumbo. From 1935 to Hart's death in 1943, they wrote a string of highly regarded Broadway musicals, most of which were hits.

Many of their stage musicals from the late 1930s were made into films, such as On Your Toes (1936) and Babes in Arms (1937), though rarely with their scores intact. Pal Joey (1940), termed their "masterpiece", has a book by The New Yorker writer John O'Hara. O'Hara adapted his own short stories for the show, which featured a title character who is a heel. So unflinching was the portrait that critic Brooks Atkinson famously asked in his review "Although it is expertly done, how can you draw sweet water from a foul well?"  When the show was revived in 1952, audiences had learned to accept darker material (thanks in large part to Rodgers' work with Oscar Hammerstein II). The new production had a considerably longer run than the original and was now considered a classic by critics. Atkinson, reviewing the revival, wrote that "it renews confidence in the professionalism of the theatre."

Analysis
Time Magazine devoted a cover story to Rodgers and Hart (September 26, 1938). They wrote that their success "rests on a commercial instinct that most of their rivals have apparently ignored". The article also noted the "spirit of adventure." "As Rodgers and Hart see it, what was killing musicomedy  was its sameness, its tameness, its eternal rhyming of June with moon."

Their songs have long been favorites of cabaret singers and jazz artists. For example, Ella Fitzgerald recorded their songbook. Andrea Marcovicci based one of her cabaret acts entirely on Rodgers and Hart songs.

Hart's lyrics, facile, vernacular, dazzling, sometimes playful, sometimes melancholic, raised the standard for Broadway songwriting. "His ability to write cleverly and to come up with unexpected, polysyllabic rhymes was something of a trademark, but he also had the even rarer ability to write with utmost simplicity and deep emotion." Rodgers, as a creator of melodies, ranks with Jerome Kern and Irving Berlin.

Their shows belong to the era when musicals were revue-like and librettos were not much more than excuses for comic turns and music cues. Still, just as their songs were a cut above, so did the team try to raise the standard of the musical form in general. Thus, A Connecticut Yankee (1927) was based on Mark Twain's novel, and The Boys From Syracuse (1938) on William Shakespeare's The Comedy of Errors.  "They had always considered the integration of story and music a crucial factor in a successful show."  They used dance significantly in their work, using the ballets of George Balanchine.

Comparisons between Rodgers and Hart and the successor team of Rodgers and Hammerstein are inevitable. Hammerstein's lyrics project warmth, sincere optimism, and occasional corniness. Hart's lyrics showed greater sophistication in subject matter, more use of overt verbal cleverness, and more of a "New York" or "Broadway" sensibility. The archetypal Rodgers and Hart song, "Manhattan," rhymes "The great big city's a wondrous toy/Just made for a girl and boy" in the first stanza, then reprises with "The city's clamor can never spoil/The dreams of a boy and goil" in the last. Many of the songs ("Falling in Love with Love", "Little Girl Blue", "My Funny Valentine") are wistful or sad, and emotional ambivalence seems to be perceptible in the background of even the sunnier songs. For example, "You Took Advantage of Me" appears to be an evocation of amorous joy, but the very title suggests some doubt as to whether the relationship is mutual or exploitative.

Stage and film productions

(1920) Fly with Me
(1925) The Garrick Gaieties
(1925) Dearest Enemy
(1926) The Girl Friend
(1926) Betsy
(1926) Peggy-Ann
(1926) The Fifth Avenue Follies
(1926) Lido Lady
(1926) The Garrick Gaieties (2nd Edition)
(1927) A Connecticut Yankee
(1927) One Dam Thing After Another
(1928) Present Arms
(1928) Chee-Chee
(1928) She's My Baby
(1929) Heads Up!
(1930) Spring Is Here
(1930) Ever Green
(1930) Simple Simon
(1931) America's Sweetheart

(1932) Love Me Tonight (film)
(1932) The Phantom President (film)
(1933) Hallelujah, I'm a Bum (film)
(1935) Mississippi (film)
(1935) Jumbo (1962 film Billy Rose's Jumbo)
(1936) On Your Toes (1939 film)
(1936) The Show Is On (Broadway revue with one song by Rodgers and Hart)
(1937) Babes in Arms (1939 film)
(1937) I'd Rather Be Right
(1938) The Boys from Syracuse (1940 film)
(1938) I Married an Angel (1942 film)
(1939) Too Many Girls (1940 film)
(1940) Higher and Higher (1943 film)
(1940) Pal Joey (1957 film)
(1940) Two Weeks with Pay
(1942) By Jupiter
(1943) A Connecticut Yankee (revised, with additional songs, their last collaboration)

Songs
One of Rodgers and Hart's best known songs, "Blue Moon", had an unusual genesis. The tune was originally called "Prayer," and was to be sung by Jean Harlow in the 1934 film Hollywood Party, but was cut. Hart then wrote a new lyric, intended to be the title song for Manhattan Melodrama (1934), which was cut again. A third lyric, "The Bad in Every Man," was used in the film. At the urging of Jack Robbins, head of MGM's music publishing unit, Hart wrote a fourth lyric as a standalone song. Glen Grey and the Casa Loma Orchestra recorded it in 1936, and that version topped the charts for three weeks. Elvis Presley included a haunting version on his self-titled debut album, in 1956. It again was #1 in 1961, this time in the doo-wop style, by the Marcels. Bob Dylan included his Nashville-inflected version of the song on his Self Portrait album of 1970.

Frederick Nolan writes that "My Romance" (written for Jumbo) "features some of the most elegantly wistful lyrics...[it] is, quite simply, one of the best songs Rodgers and Hart ever wrote."

Other of their many hits include "My Funny Valentine", "Falling in Love with Love", "Here In My Arms", "Mountain Greenery", "My Heart Stood Still", "The Blue Room", "Ten Cents a Dance", "Dancing on the Ceiling", "Lover", "Bewitched, Bothered and Bewildered", "Mimi", and "Have You Met Miss Jones?".

List of well-known songs

 

(1925) "Manhattan" and "Mountain Greenery" (from The Garrick Gaieties)
(1925) “Here In My Arms” (from Dearest Enemy)
(1926) "The Blue Room" (from The Girl Friend)
(1927) "Thou Swell" (from A Connecticut Yankee)
(1927) “My Heart Stood Still” (from One Dam Thing After Another)
(1928) "You Took Advantage of Me" (from Present Arms)
(1929) “A Ship Without a Sail” (from Me For You)
(1930) "Yours Sincerely" and "With a Song in My Heart" (from Spring Is Here)
(1930) “Ten Cents a Dance” and “Dancing on the Ceiling” (from Simple Simon)
(1931) “I’ve Got Five Dollars” (from America’s Sweetheart)
(1932) "Lover", "Mimi", and "Isn't It Romantic?", (from Love Me Tonight)
(1932) "You Are Too Beautiful" (from Hallelujah, I'm a Bum)
(1934) "Blue Moon"
(1935) "Little Girl Blue", "The Most Beautiful Girl in the World" (from Jumbo)
(1935) "It's Easy to Remember" (from Mississippi)
(1936) "There's a Small Hotel", and "Glad to Be Unhappy" (from On Your Toes)
(1937) "Where or When", "I Wish I Were in Love Again", "My Funny Valentine", "Johnny One Note", and "The Lady Is a Tramp" (from Babes in Arms)
(1937) "Have You Met Miss Jones?" (from I'd Rather Be Right)
(1938) "This Can't Be Love", "Falling in Love with Love", and “Sing For Your Supper” (from The Boys from Syracuse)
(1938) "Spring Is Here" and "I'll Tell the Man in the Street" (from I Married an Angel)
(1939) "I Didn't Know What Time It Was", "I Like to Recognize the Tune", "Give It Back to the Indians" (from Too Many Girls)
(1940) "It Never Entered My Mind" (from Higher and Higher)
(1940) "Bewitched, Bothered and Bewildered", "I Could Write a Book", and “Zip” (from Pal Joey)
(1942) "Wait Till You See Her", "Nobody's Heart Belongs to Me", "Ev'rything I've Got" (from By Jupiter)
(1943) “To Keep My Love Alive” (from A Connecticut Yankee)

Other works
All Points West (1937), monodrama commissioned by Paul Whiteman and Rodgers & Hart's first "serious" composition

See also
Rodgers and Hammerstein
List of songwriter tandems
Herbert Fields

Notes

References
Block, Geoffrey Holden. The Richard Rodgers Reader (2002), Oxford University Press US, 
Denison, Chuck. The Great American Songbook: Stories of the Standards (2004), Author's Choice Publishing, 
Everett, William and Laird, Paul. The Cambridge Companion to the Musical (2008), Cambridge University Press, 
Green, Stanley. The World of Musical Comedy (1984, 4th Edition), Da Capo Press, 
Nolan, Frederick. Lorenz Hart: A Poet on Broadway (1995), Oxford University Press US,
Secrest, Meryle. Somewhere for Me: A Biography of Richard Rodgers (2002), Hal Leonard Corporation, 
Zinnser, William. Easy to Remember (2000), Godine,

External links
Interview with Mary Rodgers about Rodgers and Hart for PBS (1999)

History of The Musical Stage, 1920s IV, by John Kenrick, musicals101.com

American songwriting teams
American musical duos
Columbia University alumni